The Leeds Times was a weekly newspaper established in 1833, and published at the office in Briggate, Leeds, West Yorkshire, England. It ceased publication on 30 March 1901, with Robert Nicoll as one of its first editors, and Samuel Smiles as its editor from 1839 to 1848.

History
The first issue of Leeds Times was on Thursday 7 March 1833, the last issue was 30 March 1901.

References

External links
Robert Nicoll Editorials from the Leeds Times

Defunct newspapers published in the United Kingdom
Mass media in Leeds
Publications established in 1833
Publications disestablished in 1901
1833 establishments in England